Arvind Pandey is an Indian politician and member of the Bharatiya Janata Party. Arvind Pandey was born in Bazpur. Pandey is a member of the Uttarakhand Legislative Assembly from the Gadarpur Uttarakhand Assembly constituency Gadarpur constituency in Udham Singh Nagar district.

Pandey was the member of cabinet in the state of Uttarakhand headed by chief minister Pushkar Singh Dhami.Pandey was minister for primary education and sports in government of Uttarakhand. A total of 12 criminal cases have been filed against Pandey.

References

External links 
 

People from Udham Singh Nagar district
Bharatiya Janata Party politicians from Uttarakhand
Uttarakhand MLAs 2022–2027
Living people
21st-century Indian politicians
Year of birth missing (living people)